Dmitriyevka is a rural locality (a village) in Mrakovsky Selsoviet, Gafuriysky District, Bashkortostan, Russia. The population was 67 as of 2010.

Geography 
It is located 31 km from Krasnousolsky and 3 km from Mrakovo.

References 

Rural localities in Gafuriysky District